Loay Elbasyouni is a Palestinian-American electrical engineer. He helped design the Mars rover Perseverance and was an electrical and power electronics lead in the team that built the Ingenuity helicopter.

Early life 
Elbasyouni was born in Germany while his father was studying medicine in that country. He moved to Beit Hanoun in Gaza when he was five years old. He lived through the First Intifada, a period in which the academic year was shortened to as few as eighty days. He attended UNRWA schools during his primary and secondary education. In 1998, he moved to the United States at the age of twenty to continue higher education. He received a Master's degree in Electrical Engineering from the University of Louisville in 2005.

Career 
In 2012, Elbasyouni began working for a company developing an electric aircraft. In 2014, the company became a contractor for NASA, and Elbasyouni became an electric and power electronics lead for the Mars helicopter team. As of 2023, he works for the Jet Propulsion Laboratory. He has been a member of the team that sent the Perseverance to Mars in March 2020 and a chief engineer for the design team of the Ingenuity robotic helicopter.

Personal life 
Elbasyouni lives in Los Angeles, California. He has not returned to Palestine since 2000 due to instability in the region.

See Also 
Munther A. Dahleh

References 

Year of birth missing (living people)
Living people
Palestinian engineers
Palestinian electrical engineers